Abū Muḥammad Ismāʿīl ibn Jaʿfar al-Mubārak (c.719 AD – c.762 AD) was the eldest son of Imam Ja'far al-Sadiq. He is also known as Isma'il al-Ãraj ibn Ja'far al-Sadiq (اسماعيل الاعرج ابن جعفر الصادق). Following Ja'far's death in 765, the Shia community split between those who believed the Imamate was passed to Musa ibn Ja'far, who would become the Twelver Shia, and those who believed that the Imamate passed to Isma'il ibn Ja'far (they believed he was still alive), who would become the Isma'ili branch named after Isma'il.

Biography
Isma'il was born in Shawwal 100 AH/719 AD He was the eldest son of Imam Ja'far al-Sadiq. His mother, Fatima bint al-Husayn'l-Athram ibn al-Hasan ibn Ali, was the first wife of Ja'far al-Sadiq. He was the brother of Abdullah al-Aftah.

Isma'ili sources say that, after the age of seven, as his father's designated successor, Isma'il was kept apart from his siblings, limited in his contact with the public, with his father taking personal responsibility for his education. Given his father's reputation as a scholar and the number of distinguished students who sought out his tuition, Isma'il would have received excellent training. It is said that whenever Ja'far was ill and unable to fulfill his duties as Imam, he deputized Isma'il, although his role was restricted to the confines of the home.

According to Daftary, Isma'il may have taken part in an anti-Abbasid plot in 755 and identified with the more activist, or militant Shi'a (some of whom split off as the Zaydis). He may have been summoned to the Caliph's court with others to face charges but was spared execution, unlike some of his fellow plotters.

To protect him from persecution, his father sent him into hiding and publicly declared him deceased. The majority Twelver groups argue that Isma'il actually died during his father's Imamate in the year 138 AH/756 AD.

In about 762, Isma'il may have left Medina for Basra, although this is disputed. He is said to have had a full grasp of the esoteric truth, the inner message of Islam. He was succeeded by his son, Muhammad, as the 8th Isma'ili Imam, who was about 22 at the time. Some Isma'ilis believe that Muhammad bin Isma'il became "hidden" and will return as the Mahdi, to establish universal peace and justice.

According to Daftary, Isma'il may have led a revolt against the Abbasids in 815, "and died shortly afterwards" in Medina. He probably lived in "southwestern Persia ... from where he dispatched his own Da'is to adjoining areas".

Burial place
According to some Isma'ili sources,  Isma'il ibn Ja'far is buried in Salamiyah, a city located in Syria. Other sources point to Al-Baqi', Medina as his burial place. Twelver Shia's and Sunni Muslims sources have contradicted this, stating that he was buried in Al-Baqi Cemetery Medina, the holy Islamic city located in Hijaz.

The Isma'ili–Twelver schism
The Isma'ili–Twelver split occurred during and after Imam Ja'far al-Sadiq's lifetime. It was initially thought that Imam Ja'far al-Sadiq's elder son, Isma'il ibn Ja'far (either first or second eldest to his first wife, Fatima bint al-Husayn). would be the next Imam, arguably found in both Ismā'īlī and Twelver sources. However, his untimely death prior to Imam Ja'far al-Sadiq's death, led to multiple splits and theories within the community.

What came to be known as Isma'ilis, are those who believed that the Imamate should remain within the line of Isma'il ibn Ja’far. It was believed that the designation went to Isma'il ibn Ja'far, and therefore the Imamate should continue through his lineage. His early supporters initially theorized that Isma'il ibn Ja’far's death was staged, and he went into hiding out of fear for his life from the Abbasid Caliph al-Mansūr. They refused to acknowledge his death, and some even claimed to have seen him after his funeral. However, most Ismā'īlīs later accepted Isma'il ibn Ja’far's death, and instead followed his son Muhammad ibn Isma'il as the next Imam, since the Imamate could still be continued through Isma'il ibn Ja’far's lineage. On a theological level, Ismai'lis refuse to acknowledge Imams outside of the lineage of Ismail ibn Ja’far due to the notion of naṣṣ (designation) and ‘ișma (infallibility). Because Shi’as believe that the Imams are infallible and contain special knowledge of the Divine decree, it is inconceivable that Imam Ja'far al-Sādiq would have incorrectly chosen Imam Isma'il ibn Ja’far as his successor and then retract his original naṣṣ. This would mean that Imam Ja'far al-Sādiq either made a major mistake which would make him fallible, or later claims regarding other designations were forged narrations. 

Ithna-'Asharis, following the early death of Isma'il ibn Ja’far acknowledged the designation of Imam Ja'far al-Sādiq’s younger son, Mūsā al-Kāẓim, from his slave-wife, Ḥamīda al-Barbariyya. Various hadith reports from the Twelver Shi’i collection contain narrations about the designation of Imam Mūsā al-Kāẓim, along with his exceptional character and wisdom from an early age. Witnesses include some of Imam Jafar al-Sadiq’s sons, ‘Ali and Isḥāq, who affirmed Mūsā al-Kāẓim’s naṣṣ. Other arguments made for Imam Mūsā al-Kāẓim include the passing down of special objects that belonged to the Prophet, ‘Ali and Fatima to the designated Imams. While the early followers (later Twelvers) of Imam Jafar al-Sadiq believed that Isma'il ibn Ja'far might have been the Imam due to his beloved status by his father, some argue that he was neither explicitly designated, nor meant to be, due to his early death.  Another mainstream view also purports a “change” or “abrogation” in the Divine Decree, known as badā’, in which God may abrogate a previous decree for something better.  As a result, Imam Ja'far al-Sādiq's infallibility is not called into question.  The Ithna-‘Asharis continued to follow the Imamate from Mūsā al-Kāẓim's lineage until their twelfth Imam went into Occultation. They await their twelfth Imam as the final Mahdi.

Ancestry

See also
 Waqifite Shia
 List of Isma'ili imams
 Family tree linking Prophets to Shi'ite Imams

References

 

722 births
755 deaths
Family of Muhammad
Husaynids
Ismaili imams
8th-century Arabs
Burials at Jannat al-Baqī